Arendals Fossekompani ASA is a Norwegian company located in Arendal. Its principal business is production and sale of electric energy from its 2 hydroelectric powerplants. It is listed on the Oslo Stock Exchange. The company is also the controlling owner with a 60% ownership in Markedskraft.

References

External links 

 Official web site

Companies listed on the Oslo Stock Exchange
Electric power companies of Norway
Companies based in Agder
Arendal